Salisbury station or Salisbury railway station may refer to:

Salisbury railway station, in Salisbury, Wiltshire, England
Salisbury railway station, Adelaide, in South Australia
Salisbury railway station, Brisbane, in Queensland, Australia
Salisbury station (North Carolina), an Amtrak station in Salisbury, North Carolina

See also
Salisbury (disambiguation)